Kirané Kaniaga is commune in the Cercle of Yélimané in the Kayes Region of south-western Mali. The administrative centre (chef-lieu) is the small town of Kirané. In 2009 the commune had a population of 35,007.

References

External links
.

Communes of Kayes Region